The Pan American Weightlifting Championships is the continental weightlifting championships for nations from North America, Central America, South America and the Caribbean organised by Pan American Weightlifting Federation (PAWF).

Senior editions 
List of championships:
1996 to 2000 held in the northern and central (NACA) regions and the southern (SA) region.

Note: NACA = North America and Central America / SA = South America

See also 
 Weightlifting at the Pan American Games

References

External links
Pan American Weightlifting Federation website

 
Weightlifting competitions
International sports championships in the Americas
Recurring sporting events